"Saturday Night" is a song by American rock band Drowning Pool. The song was released on November 13, 2012 off their album Resilience. The song is described as melodic and described as an anthem.

Concept
In an interview with Noisecreep, bassist Stevie Benton said "The question I am most often asked is ‘What’s life on tour like?’ This song is my best description of a typical day on the road.”

Music video
The music video shows the band playing in a house in front of a huge crowd during a party. It shows people partying, scantily clad women and people having fun. Eventually in the video, the police break up the party due to its intensity.

Track listing

Personnel
 Stevie Benton Bass, backing vocals
  Mike Luce Drums
  Jasen Moreno Vocals
  C.J. Pierce Electric guitar, backing vocals

Charts

References

External links

2012 singles
2012 songs
Drowning Pool songs
Songs written by Stevie Benton